The Municipality of Miren-Kostanjevica is a municipality in western Slovenia, on the border with Italy.

Miren-Kostanjevica is part of the Goriška region of the Slovene Littoral, and its main settlements are Miren (the seat of the municipality) and Kostanjevica na Krasu. Miren is located in the lowest part of the Vipava Valley.

Historically, the area was connected with the neighbouring village of Savogna d'Isonzo (Slovenian: Sovodnje ob Soči), which was left in Italy after the Paris Peace Treaty of February 1947. Since the second half of the 19th century, Miren has been a commercial center and a center of light industry, strongly linked to the Gorizia and Monfalcone (Slovenian: Tržič) urban areas. Kostanjevica na Krasu, on the other hand, is a center of a larger underpopulated rural area located on the high Karst Plateau. In the local self-government reform of 1994, the two centers united to form a single municipality. Since 1947, both localities have gravitated towards the Nova Gorica–Šempeter conurbation, where many locals commute daily.

Miren has a border crossing into Italy.

Settlements
In addition to the municipal seat of Miren, the municipality also includes the following settlements:

 Bilje
 Hudi Log
 Korita na Krasu
 Kostanjevica na Krasu
 Lipa
 Lokvica
 Nova Vas
 Novelo
 Opatje Selo
 Orehovlje
 Sela na Krasu
 Temnica
 Vojščica
 Vrtoče

Notable natives and residents
Oskar Kogoj, designer
Dean Komel, philosopher
Drago Marušič, politician, governor of the Drava Banovina (1931–34)
Negovan Nemec, sculptor
Igor Torkar, writer and political activist
Stanko Vuk, poet and anti-fascist activist

References

External links

 Municipality of Miren-Kostanjevica on Geopedia
 Municipal website

 
1994 establishments in Slovenia
Miren-Kostanjevica